Washington Flats is located in the old northwest section of  Davenport, Iowa, United States. It has been listed on the National Register of Historic Places since 1984.

Architecture
Washington Flats is a local expression of the urban row houses that were built after the mid-19th century in Davenport. It was designed in a simplified Neoclassical style that was typical of many structures built in the city around the turn of the 20th century. The building is a long two-story brick structure with four double entrances into the apartments across the front of the building. A bay window with a fifth entrance is in the center of the building. The porches with shared entrances have partial cornice returns. They also have a screen with wood cut-outs between each doorway. The building features a corbelled brick belt course, and egg-and-dart molding on the facia of the metal cornice.

References

Residential buildings completed in 1905
Apartment buildings on the National Register of Historic Places in Iowa
Apartment buildings in Davenport, Iowa
National Register of Historic Places in Davenport, Iowa
Neoclassical architecture in Iowa
1905 establishments in Iowa